Hexoplon is a genus of beetles in the family Cerambycidae, containing the following species:

 Hexoplon affine (Thomson, 1865)
 Hexoplon albipenne Bates, 1872
 Hexoplon annulatum Martins & Galileo, 2011
 Hexoplon anthracinum Martins, 1967
 Hexoplon armatum Aurivillius, 1899
 Hexoplon bellulum Galileo & Martins, 2010
 Hexoplon bucki Martins, 1967
 Hexoplon calligrammum Bates, 1885
 Hexoplon carissimum (White, 1855)
 Hexoplon cearense Martins & Galileo, 1999
 Hexoplon ctenostomoides Thomson, 1867
 Hexoplon eximium Aurivillius, 1899
 Hexoplon illuminum Napp & Martins, 1985
 Hexoplon immaculatum Galileo & Martins, 2009
 Hexoplon integrum Tippmann, 1960
 Hexoplon juno Thomson, 1865
 Hexoplon leucostictum Martins, 1959
 Hexoplon longispina Aurivillius, 1899
 Hexoplon lucidum Martins, 1962
 Hexoplon navajasi Martins, 1959
 Hexoplon nigricolle Gounelle, 1909
 Hexoplon nigritarse Aurivillius, 1899
 Hexoplon nigropiceum Martins, 1959
 Hexoplon praetermissum Bates, 1870
 Hexoplon reinhardti Aurivillius, 1899
 Hexoplon rosalesi Martins, 1971
 Hexoplon scutellare Napp & Martins, 1985
 Hexoplon speciosum Fisher, 1937
 Hexoplon uncinatum Gounelle, 1909
 Hexoplon venus Thomson, 1864

References

Ibidionini